The Lears is a 2017 American comedy-drama film and the adaptation of William Shakespeare's King Lear. Directed by Carl Bessai, it stars Bruce Dern, Anthony Michael Hall and Sean Astin.

Plot

On a family weekend, the father explodes a bombshell for his children that he will marry his assistant and everything gets complicated.

Cast
Bruce Dern as Davenport Lear
Anthony Michael Hall as Glenn Lear
Sean Astin as Tom Cornwall
Aly Michalka as Regan Lear
Victoria Smurfit as Diana
Nicholas Bishop as Kent Lear
James Hoare as Rory Lear

Production
The film was shot in Malibu and Los Angeles.

References

External links
 

American comedy-drama films
Films directed by Carl Bessai
Films scored by Mark Orton
Films shot in California
Films shot in Los Angeles
Modern adaptations of works by William Shakespeare
Films based on King Lear
2017 comedy-drama films
2010s English-language films
2010s American films